Los Quillayes is an elevated metro station on the Line 4 of the Santiago Metro, in Santiago, Chile. It named for the neighborhood where it is located. The station was opened on 30 November 2005 as part of the inaugural section of the line between Vicente Valdés and Plaza de Puente Alto.

References

Santiago Metro stations
Santiago Metro Line 4